The BICh-21  (a.k.a. SG-1) (Samolyet Gonochnii – racing aeroplane) was a tail-less racing aircraft designed and built in the USSR from 1938.

Development 
To compete in the August 1941 Osoaviakhim all-union air race Chyeranovskii followed the successful recipe he used in the BICh-20, building the smallest possible aircraft to house the Renault 6 in-line MV-6 engine and the cockpit in the leading edge of the fin. The inverted gull wings allowed a shorter, pneumatically retracted tail-wheel undercarriage, to be fitted at the junction of the inner and outer wings. The aircraft was completed in 1940 but flight tests were not carried out till June 1941. The BICh-21 was a firm favourite to win the all-union air race but Operation Barbarossa intervened, with the start of the Great Patriotic War, further work on the BICh-21 was stopped..

Specifications (BICh-21)

See also

References

 Gunston, Bill. “The Osprey Encyclopaedia of Russian Aircraft 1875 – 1995”. London, Osprey. 1995.

External links

 

Inverted gull-wing aircraft
1940s Soviet sport aircraft
BICh-21
Aircraft first flown in 1941